Jabdi may refer to:
Jabdi, Dhawalagiri, Nepal
Jabdi, Janakpur, Nepal